Celso Fabián Ortiz Gamarra (born 26 January 1989), commonly known as Celso Ortiz, is a Paraguayan professional footballer who currently plays as a midfielder for Liga MX club Monterrey and the Paraguay national team.

Career

On 26 August 2009, AZ Alkmaar secured the services of the Paraguayan football midfielder. The Dutch club have signed him from Cerro Porteño on a five-year deal. Ortiz joined AZ in January 2010. On 6 June 2016, Monterrey coach Antonio Mohamed announced that Ortiz would be their first signing ahead of the Apertura 2016.

International career

Ortiz was a member of the Paraguay national under-20 football team and represented the team at 2009 FIFA U-20 World Cup held in Egypt.

He was selected in the final 23-man squad for the 2019 Copa América, playing the full 90 minutes in the quarterfinal loss against host Brazil.

Honours
AZ Alkmaar
KNVB Cup: 2012–13

Monterrey
Liga MX: Apertura 2019
Copa MX: Apertura 2017, 2019–20
CONCACAF Champions League: 2019, 2021

References

External links

Voetbal International profile 

1989 births
Living people
Paraguayan footballers
Paraguay international footballers
Paraguayan people of Basque descent
Paraguay under-20 international footballers
Association football defenders
Cerro Porteño players
AZ Alkmaar players
C.F. Monterrey players
Paraguayan Primera División players
Eredivisie players
Liga MX players
Paraguayan expatriate footballers
Expatriate footballers in the Netherlands
Expatriate footballers in Mexico
Paraguayan expatriate sportspeople in the Netherlands
Sportspeople from Asunción
Copa América Centenario players
2019 Copa América players